Chicago XXXVII: Chicago Christmas, also known as simply Chicago Christmas, is the twenty-fifth studio album, the fourth collection of Christmas songs, and thirty-seventh album overall by the American rock band, Chicago. The album was released on October 11, 2019. The project grew out of a plan to record a few new bonus tracks for a re-release of one of the band's prior holiday albums. Unlike previous Christmas albums, Chicago Christmas features primarily original material, written by members of the band. The only non-original songs on the album are "What the World Needs Now Is Love", "Sleigh Ride (2019)", and "Here We Come a Caroling". Chicago Christmas reached number one on the Billboard Holiday Albums Sales Chart.

Chicago Christmas reflects several personnel changes in the band's lineup since their previous studio release from 2014, Chicago XXXVI: Now. This is their first studio album since the departure of singer-bassist Jason Scheff, who left the group in 2016. He was replaced by Jeff Coffey, who never recorded an album with the group and was subsequently succeeded in 2018 by singer Neil Donell and bassist Brett Simons. It is also the first album since Chicago 19 not to feature longtime drummer Tris Imboden, who departed in 2018. Chicago percussionist Walfredo Reyes Jr. took over as drummer, with his previous position being filled by Ramon Yslas. Additionally, this is the first Chicago album not to feature saxophonist Walter Parazaider who retired in 2017 and was replaced by Ray Herrmann.

Track listing

Personnel 
Adapted from the album liner notes.

Chicago
 Robert Lamm – keyboards, lead and backing vocals, horn arrangements
 Lee Loughnane – trumpet, backing vocals
 James Pankow – trombone, backing vocals, horn arrangements
 Keith Howland – guitars, backing vocals
 Lou Pardini – keyboards, lead and backing vocals
 Walfredo Reyes Jr. – drums, percussion
 Ray Herrmann – saxophones, flute, clarinet, backing vocals, horn arrangements
 Neil Donell – lead and backing vocals
 Brett Simons – bass, backing vocals
 Ramon Yslas – percussion

Additional musicians
 Nick Lane – horn arrangements
 Tim Jessup – string arrangements

Production 
 Lee Loughnane – producer
 Tim Jessup – recording, mixing
 Scott Koopman – basic track recording
 Adam Ayan – mastering
 Matthew Pardini – cover artwork

Charts

References

External links
 https://chicagotheband.com/news/chicago-christmas-available-october-4th-from-rhino/

2019 Christmas albums
Chicago (band) albums